François Marius Granet (17 December 1775 – 21 November 1849) was a French painter.

Biography
François Marius Granet was born on 17 December 1775  in Aix-en-Provence; his father was a small builder. As a boy his strong desires led his parents to place him, after some preliminary teaching from a passing Italian artist, in a free school of art directed by M. Constantin, a landscape painter of some reputation. In 1793, Granet followed the volunteers of Aix to the siege of Toulon, where he obtained employment as a decorator in the arsenal.

Whilst a lad he had, at Aix, made the acquaintance of the young comte de Forbin, and upon his invitation Granet, in the year 1797, went to Paris. De Forbin was one of the pupils of David, and Granet entered the same studio. Later he got possession of a cell in the convent of Capuchins, which, having served for a manufactory of assignats during the Revolution, was afterwards inhabited almost exclusively by artists. In the changing lights and shadows of the corridors of the Capuchins, Granet found the materials for that one picture to the painting of which, with varying success, he devoted his life.

In 1802, he left Paris for Rome, where he remained until 1819, when he returned to Paris, bringing with him besides various other works one of fourteen repetitions of his celebrated "Chœur des Capucins," executed in 1811. The figures of the monks celebrating mass are taken in this subject as a substantive part of the architectural effect, and this is the case with all Granet's works, even with those in which the figure subject would seem to assert its importance, and its historical or romantic interest. "Stella painting a Madonna on his Prison Wall," 1810 (Leuchtenberg collection); "Sodoma à l'hôpital," 1815 (Louvre); "Basilique basse de St François d'Assise," 1823 (Louvre); "Rachat de prisonniers," 1831 (Louvre); "Mort de Poussin," 1834 (Villa Demidoff, Florence), are among his principal works; all are marked by the same peculiarities, everything is sacrificed to tone.

In 1819, Louis Philippe decorated Granet, and afterwards named him Chevalier de l'Ordre St Michel, and Conservateur des tableaux de Versailles (1826). He became a member of the institute in 1830; but in spite of these honours, and the ties which bound him to M. de Forbin, then director of the Louvre, Granet constantly returned to Rome. After 1848 he retired to Aix, immediately lost his wife, and died himself on 21 November 1849. He bequeathed the greater part of his fortune to his native town and all his collections (including the very fine portrait by Ingres from 1811 ) to the Museum of Aix en Provence, which was renamed the Musée Granet in 1949, the centenary of his death.

Gallery

Memorial
A museum in the centre of Aix-en-Provence is named after him, the Musée Granet. It was built in 1838, and holds eight paintings by Paul Cézanne.

Notes

References

External links

1777 births
1849 deaths
Artists from Aix-en-Provence
18th-century French painters
French male painters
19th-century French painters
Members of the Académie des beaux-arts
19th-century French male artists
18th-century French male artists